HMCS St. Pierre was a River-class frigate that served with the Royal Canadian Navy during the Second World War. She saw action as a convoy escort during the Battle of the Atlantic. She was named for Havre-Saint-Pierre, Quebec, whose name was shortened due to its length. After the war she was sold to Peru and renamed Teniente Palacios in 1947.

St. Pierre was ordered on 1 February 1943 as part of the 1943–1944 River-class building program. She was laid down on 30 June 1943 by Davie Shipbuilding and Repairing Co. Ltd. at Lauzon, Quebec and launched on 1 December later that year. She was commissioned into the Royal Canadian Navy on 28 August 1944 at Quebec City.

Background

The River-class frigate was designed by William Reed of Smith's Dock Company of South Bank-on-Tees. Originally called a "twin-screw corvette", its purpose was to improve on the convoy escort classes in service with the Royal Navy at the time, including the Flower-class corvette. The first orders were placed by the Royal Navy in 1940 and the vessels were named for rivers in the United Kingdom, giving name to the class. In Canada they were named for towns and cities though they kept the same designation. The name "frigate" was suggested by Vice-Admiral Percy Nelles of the Royal Canadian Navy and was adopted later that year.

Improvements over the corvette design included improved accommodation which was markedly better. For underwater targets, the River-class frigate was equipped with a Hedgehog anti-submarine mortar and depth charge rails aft and four side-mounted throwers.

River-class frigates were the first Royal Canadian Navy warships to carry the 147B Sword horizontal fan echo sonar transmitter in addition to the irregular ASDIC. This allowed the ship to maintain contact with targets even while firing unless a target was struck. Improved radar and direction-finding equipment improved the RCN's ability to find and track enemy submarines over the previous classes.

Canada originally ordered the construction of 33 frigates in October 1941. The design was too big for the shipyards on the Great Lakes so all the frigates built in Canada were built in dockyards along the west coast or along the St. Lawrence River. In all Canada ordered the construction of 60 frigates including ten for the Royal Navy that transferred two to the United States Navy.

War service
After arriving at Halifax, Nova Scotia, St. Pierre underwent four months of repairs. She finally set out to work up at Bermuda in March 1945 and in April set out for the United Kingdom having been assigned to escort group EG 9. In May she was to escort Russia-bound convoys, but instead was detached and was sent to escort surrendered U-boats bound for Loch Eriboll.

At the end of May, St. Pierre returned to Canada to undergo a tropicalization refit in preparation for service in the southern Pacific Ocean. This meant installing water-cooling and refrigeration abilities and changing the camouflage pattern. On  4 June 1945 the work was begun at Lauzon but was cancelled on 20 August due to the surrender of Japan. She was paid off 22 November 1945 at Sydney, Nova Scotia and laid up at Shelburne in reserve.

Postwar service
St. Pierre underwent a minor refit at Dartmouth in 1947 at the cost of $200,000 after being sold to the Peruvian Navy. From there she sailed to Peru where she was recommissioned as the Teniente Palacios. She was renamed as Palacios in 1953. In 1954 she was sent to the United States to have her armament and fire control upgraded.  She was discarded in 1966 and broken up.

References
Notes

References
Macpherson, Ken; Burgess, John. The ships of Canada's naval forces 1910–1981 : a complete pictorial history of Canadian warships. Collins: Toronto, 1981. 

River-class frigates of the Royal Canadian Navy
1943 ships